= Penthile =

Ancient town of Lesbos

Penthile (Ancient Greek: Πενθίλη) was a town of ancient Lesbos.

The site of Penthile is unlocated.
